ThinkVision displays are high-end computer monitors manufactured, designed and developed by IBM and Lenovo.

ThinkVision products are built using the design language of other Think devices such as the ThinkPad line of notebook computers and the ThinkCentre or ThinkStation lines of desktops.
ThinkVisions are also one of the preferred brands used by the United Nations

Computer monitors

E series

Affordable, comfortable, wide-angle monitors that deliver sharp visuals in the office or at home.

S series

Mainstream monitors with balanced performance and style, optimal for small and medium business settings and budgets. Typical specifications include a Full HD VA/WVA display with a resolution of 1920 × 1080 combined with a 178° vision angle and to TÜV Low Blue Light certification and a flicker-free display typical for this line in early 2021. The quick-change tilting stand and VESA mount mean this monitor is optimal for most kinds of office environments.

L series

Similar to The S Series but have smaller display sizes in their range

LT series

Marketed to enterprises that need an energy-efficient, fully functional display screen, with good visual quality. Usually has VGA, DVI-D, and DisplayPort connections. The LT-series has swivel, tilt, and lift options, 5 milliseconds response time, and a 1000:1 contrast ratio.

T series

High-performance, ergonomic monitors for business and corporate use, including VoIP and USB hub models. This line comes with a WVA borderless display that reproduces vivid colours and sharp images. VGA, DP and HDMI ports ensure that all connectivity requirements are fulfilled.

P series

Premium performance monitor line, typically boasting the highest resolutions and latest features.

X series

This line have a sleek design and mainstream hi-end functionality – monitors that project a stylish, professional image.  This line enables natural colour transitions and effortless work on a variety of demanding tasks, the comfortable angle of vision, high resolution and advanced connection options.

X1 series

Pro series
In January 2014, Lenovo launched the ThinkVision Pro2840m. It was marketed as the "Ultimate Professional 4K Display". Some additions were made to the product: a 28-inch display with 4K resolution (ultra-high definition monitor) supporting an Android platform. It is supposed to be ideal for both home office and entertainment use, according to Lenovo.

Portable monitors

LT series

LT1423p
In January 2013 Lenovo announced the ThinkVision LT1423p, a mobile touchscreen display designed for use with Microsoft's Windows 8 operating system. The LT1423p is a 13.3-inch AH-IPS display with 1600x900 resolution. The face of the device is Gorilla Glass in order to make it more durable. Pen-based and multitouch finger-based input are both supported. Wired and wireless versions will both be available. The wireless version, with a suggested price of US$449. will support WiFi and USB 3.0 connections and will have a 10-hour battery life. The wired version, with a suggested price of US$349, will use USB for both data and power.

M series

M14
The portable 14" 1920x1080 USB-C monitor for enhanced productivity on-the-go. The 35.6 cm (14.0") screen can helps to expand portable workspace on the go, display have a pair of the USB-C ports on both sides that allow both right and left-handers to work acceptable efficiently. The ThinkVision M14 oriented for portability, connectivity, and flexibility, and for mobile productivity.

References

See also
Dell Ultrasharp displays
HP DreamColor displays
EIZO ColorEdge displays
NEC MultiSync displays
Iiyama ProLite displays

Lenovo monitors
IBM monitors